Tahir Ali (born 15 October 1971) is a British Labour politician who has served as the Member of Parliament (MP) for Birmingham Hall Green since 2019.

Early life 
Ali has previously worked for Royal Mail after securing an engineering apprenticeship at age 17. He is an active trade unionist and served as a political officer for the Communication Workers Union.

Political career

Local government 
Ali has represented the Nechells Ward on Birmingham City Council since 1999. He served as part of the council's cabinet from 2000 to 2003 and 2012 to 2016, (shadow cabinet 2004 to 2012) his responsibilities including local services, development, jobs, skills, transport and the economy. In 2012, he was the only ethnic minority member of the team.

Parliament campaign 
He was selected as the Hall Green candidate after Hall Green Constituency Labour Party members overwhelmingly voted to open selections for their Parliamentary Candidate in October 2019. The snap general election called for 12 December meant that the candidate selection process was undertaken by the Labour Party's National Executive Committee.

The campaign was marred by intimidation from former MP Roger Godsiff's supporters, resulting in three police investigations, one arrest for malicious communications and police patrols outside polling stations. Nevertheless, Ali retained the seat with a sizeable majority and hoped to "bring communities together".

Member of Parliament 
Ali endorsed Rebecca Long-Bailey in the 2020 Labour Party leadership election and Angela Rayner in the deputy leadership election.

Ali has been a member of the European Scrutiny Committee since 2 March 2020.

Ali has been critical of the government of Narendra Modi in India. In March 2021, Ali expressed his "absolute support for, and solidarity with, the farmers protesting in India" and called for sanctions to be imposed on the government of India, citing the "abuse the human and civil rights not only of farmers, but of Kashmiri people through the military occupation of the region". Ali further said that "political opponents of Modi in India are at risk of arbitrary arrest, and the civil liberties of all Indians are being eroded by an extremist, rightwing government".

On 24 February 2022, following the 2022 Russian invasion of Ukraine, Ali was one of 11 Labour MPs threatened with losing the party whip after they signed a statement by the Stop the War Coalition which questioned the legitimacy of NATO and accused the military alliance of "eastward expansion". All 11 MPs subsequently removed their signatures.

Lockdown controversy 
In April 2020, Ali was given a formal warning by police after he broke government restrictions by attending a funeral with up to 100 mourners during the coronavirus pandemic. West Midlands Labour Party Police commissioner David Jamieson also publicly condemned Ali's conduct, stating that his actions were "totally irresponsible" and that he "is not serving his constituents by endangering their lives". Ali issued an apology stating that he only attended as an observer and would not be attending any other similar gatherings.

References

External links

Living people
British Muslims
Labour Party (UK) MPs for English constituencies
UK MPs 2019–present
Place of birth missing (living people)
British politicians of Pakistani descent
Councillors in Birmingham, West Midlands
Labour Party (UK) councillors
1971 births